There are three known thrombin receptors (ThrR), termed PAR1, PAR3 and PAR4 (PAR for protease-activated receptor).

G-protein-coupled receptors that are responsible for the coagulation effects and responses of thrombin on cells are known as protease-activated receptors, or PARs. These receptors are members of the 7-transmembrane g protein-coupled family of receptors, however, their method of activation is unique. Unlike most G-protein-coupled receptors, PARs are irreversibly activated by proteolytic mechanism and therefore, are strictly regulated.

Thrombin is an allosteric serine protease that is an essential effector of coagulation that is produced at sites of vascular injury and plays a critical role in cellular response to blood-related diseases. It binds to and cleaves the extracellular N-terminal domain of the receptor. A tethered ligand corresponding to the new N-terminus, SFLLRN, is then unmasked, binding to the second extracellular loop of the receptor and activating it.

Tissue distribution 
PAR1, PAR3, and PAR4 are activated by thrombin. There are species-specific differences in thrombin receptor expression in platelets and other cell types, in which differences in thrombin concentrations may considerably affect platelet activation of distinct PARs. As seen in human platelets, PAR1 and PAR4 are the functional thrombin receptors, whereas PAR3 and PAR4 are functional thrombin receptors in mouse platelets

Thrombin receptors are also differentially expressed in cell types, e.g. PAR1 is expressed in fibroblasts, smooth muscle cells, sensory neurons and glial cells, whereas the other two are less clearly defined.

There are various roles depending on location of activation. Fibroblasts and smooth muscle cells induces growth factor and matrix production, migration and proliferation. Sensory neurons induces proliferation and release of neuroactive agents.

Regulation of signaling 
Desensitization and Internalization

Initial desensitization due to rapid phosphorylation of activated receptors by kinases, which increases affinity for arrestin. Arrestin prevents protein-receptor interaction and the receptor becomes dephosphorylated and inhibited from signaling. This is a sufficient and rapid form of termination of PAR signaling. Irreversibly activated PAR1 is internalized and terminated from further signaling by clathrin-mediated endocytosis and lysosome degradation, preventing replenishment at the cell surface.

References 

G protein-coupled receptors